Haetera is a Neotropical butterfly genus from the subfamily Satyrinae in the family Nymphalidae.

Species
 Haetera macleannania (Bates, 1865)
 Haetera piera (Linnaeus, 1758)

References

Haeterini
Nymphalidae of South America
Butterfly genera
Taxa named by Johan Christian Fabricius